is a Japanese footballer who plays for Okinawa SV as a midfielder.

Career
He signed for Albirex Niigata (S) after graduating from Osaka Sangyo University.

He scored his first goal for the White Swan in the match against Geylang International on 28/4/2018.

He scored another brace against Tampines Rovers in the match which the White Swan won 4-3.

Club 
.

References

External links
 Profile

1995 births
Living people
Japanese footballers
Singapore Premier League players
Albirex Niigata Singapore FC players
Okinawa SV players
Association football forwards